Robert Crozier (October 13, 1827October 2, 1895) was an attorney, judge and politician from Kansas. A Republican, he was most notable for his service as Chief Justice of the Kansas Supreme Court (1864–1867) and  United States Senator from Kansas (1873–1874).

Early life
Crozier was born in Cadiz, Ohio on October 13, 1827, the son of John Thomas Crozier (1790–1867) and Jane Ann (Ginn) Crozier (1801–1839). He attended the public schools and Cadiz Academy, then began to study law with an attorney in Carrollton, Ohio. He was admitted to the bar in 1848, and began to practice in Carrollton.

Start of career
While residing in Carrollton, Crozier also became editor of the Carroll Free Press newspaper. Originally active in politics as a Whig, from 1848 to 1850, Crozier served as prosecuting attorney of Carroll County. In the 1850s, Crozier served on Carroll County's board of examiners, which was responsible for reviewing the qualifications of teachers in the public schools and approving them for employment.

Continued career
Crozier moved to Leavenworth, Kansas, on March 7, 1857, where he established the Leavenworth Daily Times newspaper and continued to practice law. He became a  Republican when the party was founded in the mid-1850s, and he served on the Kansas territorial council from 1857 to 1858. In 1861, and Crozier was appointed United States attorney for the district of Kansas by President Abraham Lincoln. He served until 1864, when he resigned. From 1864 to 1867, Crozier served as Chief Justice of the Kansas Supreme Court. After leaving the bench, he resumed practicing law and also served as cashier and manager of the First National Bank of Leavenworth.

Later career
On November 24, 1873, Crozier was appointed to the United States Senate to fill the vacancy caused by the resignation of Alexander Caldwell. He was not a candidate for election to the seat, and served until February 12, 1874, when a successor was elected. After leaving the Senate, Crozier resumed his banking and legal interests in Leavenworth.

Crozier served as judge of the first judicial district of Kansas from 1876 to 1892.  He was a member of the board of directors of the Kansas Historical Society from 1886 to 1889.

Death and burial
After retiring, Crozier continued reside in Leavenworth. He died in Leavenworth on October 2, 1895. Crozier was buried at Mount Muncie Cemetery in Lansing, Kansas.

Family
In August 1852, Crozier married Margaret Atkinson (1824–1865) of Carrollton. In October 1877, Crozier married Susan Eleanor Hunt (1838–1902) of Princeton, New Jersey. With his first wife, Crozier was the father of son William (1855–1942) and daughter Margaretta (Maggie) (1863–1941). William Crozier was a career officer in the United States Army who attained the rank of brigadier general and served as the Army's Chief of Ordnance from 1901 to 1917. Margaretta Crozier was the wife of John Edgar Reyburn and mother of William Stuart Reyburn.

Notes

References

External links

1827 births
1895 deaths
American bankers
People from Cadiz, Ohio
Ohio Whigs
Politicians from Leavenworth, Kansas
Members of the Kansas Territorial Legislature
Kansas Republicans
United States Attorneys for the District of Kansas
Kansas state court judges
Chief Justices of the Kansas Supreme Court
Republican Party United States senators from Kansas
American people of Norman descent
19th-century American politicians
19th-century American judges
19th-century American businesspeople